Echis carinatus multisquamatus, known as the multiscale saw-scaled viper and transcaspian saw-scaled viper, is a viper subspecies found in Uzbekistan, Turkmenistan, Iran, Afghanistan, and Pakistan. Like all other vipers, it is venomous.

Description

Its head marking is always cross-shaped. Its lateral white line is continuous and undulating. Narrow transverse white bands occur on the middorsum.  The dorsal scales are in 34-40 rows at midbody, the highest number of rows of all subspecies of E. carinatus. The ventrals number 169-199 (highest of all subspecies).

Geographic range
The range for this snake is from Uzbekistan, south to Iran, and east to western Pakistan.

The Wildlife of Pakistan website describes the range as from the Caspian Sea, through Turkmenistan and Uzbekistan (Bukhara, Samarkand, Tashkent), into Tajikistan, along the Afghan border up to Hindukush, northeastern Balochistan, Khyber-Pakhtunkhwa, and eastern Iran.

The type locality is listed as "Bairam-Ali, Mariskaya oblast, Turkmeniya" (Baýramaly, Mary Region, Turkmenistan).

Taxonomy
It was classified as a separate species, E. multisquamatus, when first described by Cherlin (1981).

References

Further reading
 Auffenberg W, Rehman H. 1991. Studies on Pakistan Reptiles. Pt. 1. The genus Echis (Viperidae). Bull. Florida Mus. Nat. Hist., Biol Sci. 35 (5): 263-314.
 Cherlin VA. 1981. [A new saw-scaled viper, Echis multisquamatus sp. nov., from southwestern and central Asia]. [Proc. Zool. Inst. Acad. Sci. USSR] 101: 92-95. (in Russian).

External links

 
 

Viperinae
Reptiles of Pakistan